Con Solo Pensarlo is a 1998 album by the Belgian singer Axelle Red. The albums contains Spanish versions of French songs that appeared on Axelle Red's two previous albums, Sans Plus Attendre and À Tâtons.

The songs from Con Solo Pensarlo that were released as single, are "A Tientas", "Con Amor O No", "Dejame Ser Mujer" and "Sensualidad".

Track listing

 "Sensualidad" (originally "Sensualité")
 "A tientas" ("A Tâtons")
 "Con sólo pensarlo" ("Rien que d'y penser")
 "Era" ("C'était")
 "Mi oración" ("Ma Prière")
 "Te esperé" ("Je t'attends)
 "Tan infantil" ("Pas si naïf")
 "Mi café" ("Mon Café)
 "Con amor o no" ("Amoureuse ou pas")
 "Déjame ser mujer" ("Rester Femme")
 "No sufras por mí" ("T'en fais pas pour moi")
 "El mundo gira mal" ("Le Monde tourne mal")
 "Sirve de que" ("À quoi ça sert")

Charts

Certifications

References

1998 albums
Axelle Red albums